Ryan Garlock (born April 24, 1986) is a Canadian former professional ice hockey player. He most notably played in the American Hockey League (AHL).

Playing career
Garlock was drafted 45th overall in the 2004 NHL Entry Draft by the Chicago Blackhawks from the OHL. Garlock entered the Ontario Hockey League in 2002 after being drafted in the 1st Round (13th overall) by the Guelph Storm. He was traded to the Windsor Spitfires in January 2004 as Guelph prepared for a long playoff run.

Garlock had a slow start with Windsor, as he struggled with injuries and tried to find his place on the team. He had a very quiet playoff, only scoring one goal against London. Still, he was selected to play in the 2004 CHL Top Prospects Game and to play for Team Canada at the 2004 IIHF World U18 Championships, in Minsk.

Returning to Windsor, Garlock played two more seasons with the Spitfires averaging just under 1 point per game. He was traded to the Saginaw Spirit during the off season of 2006 but never played for them.

Heading into the spring of 2006, Garlock remained unsigned by the Blackhawks and, when the deadline passed for them to sign him, he could have re-entered the draft but, instead, opted to become an unrestricted free agent.

As the 2006 NHL training camp season opened, Garlock was invited to Phoenix to take part in their camp. As a result, Garlock was signed to a one-year contract with Phoenix's top AHL affiliate, the San Antonio Rampage.

In the 2007–08 season, after trying out for the AHL's Binghamton Senators, Garlock was signed by the ECHL's Johnstown Chiefs on 15 October 2007. He also had short contract stints with the Springfield Falcons and the Hershey Bears. Garlock started the 2008–09 season with the Chiefs but was signed by affiliate club, the Syracuse Crunch, and played most of the season in the AHL.

On July 20, 2009, Garlock was signed by the Hartford Wolf Pack of the AHL.

Garlock started the 2011–12 AHL season with the Springfield Falcons on a professional tryout agreement, and on October 18, 2011 was rewarded when he was signed by the team to a standard American Hockey League contract for the remainder of the season. In his second tenure with the Falcons, Garlock played in 71 games for 18 points.

On June 28, 2012, Garlock now noted with veteran status in the AHL, was offered limited opportunity in the AHL, and subsequently signed his first European contract on a one-year deal with Norwegian club Valerengens IF of the GET-ligaen.

Garlock returned to North America, signing with the Greenville Road Warriors of the ECHL on September 12, 2013. However, on October 23, 2013, before even playing a game with Greenville, he was traded to the Bakersfield Condors. On January 14, 2014, Garlock was traded for the second time of the season, this time to the San Francisco Bulls. Two weeks after getting traded though, on January 27, 2014, the San Francisco Bulls announced they were ceasing operations effective immediately, leaving Garlock and all players on an ECHL contract with San Francisco as free agents.

Career statistics

Regular season and playoffs

International

References

External links

Living people
1986 births
Bakersfield Condors (1998–2015) players
Binghamton Senators players
Canadian ice hockey centres
Charlotte Checkers (1993–2010) players
Chicago Blackhawks draft picks
Connecticut Whale (AHL) players
Guelph Storm players
Hartford Wolf Pack players
Hershey Bears players
Ice hockey people from Ontario
Johnstown Chiefs players
People from Iroquois Falls, Ontario
San Antonio Rampage players
San Francisco Bulls players
Springfield Falcons players
Syracuse Crunch players
Vålerenga Ishockey players
Windsor Spitfires players
Canadian expatriate ice hockey players in Norway
Canadian expatriate ice hockey players in the United States